Piz Tasna is a mountain of the Silvretta Alps, located between Val Tasna and Val Sinestra in Graubünden, Switzerland. On the north side of the mountain lies a glacier named Vadret da Tasna.

References

External links
 Piz Tasna on Hikr

Mountains of Graubünden
Mountains of the Alps
Alpine three-thousanders
Mountains of Switzerland
Silvretta Alps
Scuol